Metamesia intensa is a species of moth of the  family Tortricidae. It is found in South Africa.

References

	

Endemic moths of South Africa
Moths described in 1921
Archipini